Mastino I della Scala (died 26 October 1277), born Leonardo or Leonardino, was an Italian condottiero, who founded the Scaliger house of Lords of Verona.

The son of Jacopino della Scala, he was podestà of Cerea in 1259, and then podestà of Verona. Ezzelino III da Romano, the chief Ghibelline leader of northern Italy, died that year, and Mastino inherited his role. In 1260 he obtained the position of capitano del popolo ("people's captain") of Verona, managing to establish a hereditary seigniory, with a generally Ghibelline stance, from 1263. In the following year he led the Veronese army to the conquest of Lonigo and Montebello, menacing Vicenza. He was also able to shortly annex the lands of the bishop of Trent. Mastino also obtained an agreement with the Republic of Venice which granted to the Veronese free access to trades on the Adige River and signed a treaty of peace with the Guelph city of Mantua.

In 1267, when Conradin, last of the Hohenstaufen, descended into Italy to reconquer the Kingdom of Sicily, Mastino allied with him. Pope Clement IV, ally of the current King of Naples Charles I of Anjou, excommunicated Conradin and all his Ghibelline supporters, including Mastino and Verona itself. The excommunication was raised only when, a few years later, 166 Cathars captured in Sirmione were publicly burnt alive in the Arena.

During the lord's absence, a civil war broke out, spurred by the counts of San Bonifacio, who managed to capture most of Scaliger's garrisons. Mastino's brother Bocca died during the fighting. Mastino's reaction was however stiff, and he soon defeated the rebels. He also managed to impose his brother Alberto as podestà of Mantua, which had been the traditional supporter of the Veronese anti-Scaliger exiles.

Mastino was assassinated in Verona in 1277 by a member of the local aristocracy who was averse to the rule of the Scaliger; the alleged involvement of Alberto in the conspiracy is unproven. Alberto himself was able to maintain the seigniory.

References

Sources

Scala, Mastino 1
Scala, Mastino 1
Mastino 1
Scala, Mastino 1
Scala, Mastino 1
Scala, Mastino 1
Lords of Verona